Gabriela Sabatini was the defending champion but did not compete that year.

Monica Seles won in the final 4–6, 7–6, 6–3 against Lindsay Davenport.

Seeds
A champion seed is indicated in bold text while text in italics indicates the round in which that seed was eliminated. The top four seeds received a bye to the second round.

  Monica Seles (champion)
  Kimiko Date (semifinals)
  Mary Joe Fernández (quarterfinals)
  Lindsay Davenport (final)
  Brenda Schultz-McCarthy (semifinals)
  Chanda Rubin (quarterfinals)
  Amy Frazier (second round)
  Naoko Sawamatsu (second round)

Draw

Final

Section 1

Section 2

External links
 Singles and Doubles Qualifying and Main Draw

Women's Singles
Singles